Triumvirate Environmental, Inc. is a commercial waste management and environmental services provider company based in the United States.

History and overview 
Triumvirate Environmental was founded as a three-person Boston operation in 1988. It provides hazardous waste management services to Education, Healthcare, Industrial, and Life Sciences sectors. The company also provides chemical clean-up, field services, technical training and environmental consulting services. The waste-management company also transports and treats medical waste before extracting material for recycling.

It is currently headquartered in Somerville, Massachusetts and has locations throughout the United States and Canada. In 2014, the company acquired Medical Waste Recovery Inc. of Jeannette and Northern Plastic Lumber Inc. of Lindsay, Ontario.  Present CEO of the company is John McQuillan.

References 

Waste management companies of the United States
Companies based in Massachusetts
Waste companies established in 1988